The Diccionario enciclopédico hispano-americano de literatura, ciencias y artes (1887–99) was a Spanish language general encyclopedia produced by Montaner y Simón in Barcelona, Spain.

References

Further reading

External links
  (fulltext)

Spanish encyclopedias
1887 non-fiction books
Spanish online encyclopedias
Reference works in the public domain
19th-century encyclopedias